Dychko is a surname. Notable people with the surname include:

 Ivan Dychko (born 1990), Kazakh boxer
 Lesia Dychko (born 1939), Ukrainian music educator and composer
 Volodymyr Dychko (born 1972), Ukrainian footballer